Fernando von Reichenbach (1931 – March 17, 2005) was an Argentine engineer and inventor.

Inventions
Some of his inventions were:
Catalina or graphic analog converter (1967): capable of synthesizing sounds following an analog score by a video camera. 
System for inducing sleep (developed in conjunction with Dr. Fontana), by reproducing maternal prenatal sounds. 
Ultrasonic drill.

20th-century Argentine engineers
Engineers from Buenos Aires
1931 births
2005 deaths
Argentine people of German descent
Burials at La Chacarita Cemetery